Ardent Worship is the first live album by American Christian rock band Skillet. It was released in 2000 by Ardent Records seven months after Invincible. It is a worship album consisting of both live and studio recordings of six songs written by Skillet and four songs covering other artists. Original Skillet members Ken Steorts and Trey McClurkin appear on "Safe With You" and "Shout To The Lord" to finish the live set with fellow founding member John Cooper. This is the only Skillet album with no music videos and the first album with Lori Peters on drums, who replaced Trey McClurkin. Two songs come from previous Skillet albums, "Safe With You" being from their self-titled album and "Angels Fall Down" being the hidden track on Invincible.

Track listing

Credits 
Skillet
 John L. Cooper – lead vocals, bass guitar
 Korey Cooper – keyboards, backing vocals
 Kevin Haaland – guitars
 Ken Steorts – guitars (on "Safe With You" and "Shout to the Lord")
 Lori Peters – drums
 Trey McClurkin – drums (on "Safe With You" and "Shout to the Lord")

Technical
 Dana Key – executive producer 
 Patrick Scholes – executive producer 
 Skidd Mills – producer, engineer
 Matt Martone – assistant engineer 
 Jonathan Steitz – live sound engineer 
 Matt Grunden – monitor engineer 
 Brad Blackwood – mastering at Ardent Studios (Memphis, Tennessee)
 Disciple Design – art direction, design 
 Troy Glasgow – photography

Chart performance
In 2000, Ardent Worship' peaked at No. 33 on the Billboard'' Christian Albums chart.

References

Skillet (band) albums
2000 live albums